Maria Tryti Vennerød (born 17 January 1978) is a Norwegian playwright.

Career
Vennerød's first play, More, was produced at the Norwegian Drama Festival in 2002. Since then she has written about ten plays which have been performed by different theaters and ensembles in Norway and Sweden. In 2005 she received the Ibsen Award for the play The Lady at the Counter. Vennerød has directed two of her own plays, the first being Gokk in 2007 and the latter being Heat, a contemporary opera aimed at a younger audience, composed by Julian Skar. In 2010 her play Neverland was produced by Det Norske Teatret, directed by Jon Tombre.

Works

Plays
 Nasjonal Prøve ["National test"] (2011) - DUS, Det Norske Teatret
 Confession  (2011) - Schaubühne, Berlin (part of Writers´project at the F.I.N.D. festival 2011)
 Neverland (2010)- Det Norske Teatret, Oslo
 Kok ["Heat"] (2009) Contemporary opera. Music: Julian Skar. Det Åpne Teater, Oslo
 Gokk (2008) Sogn og Fjordane Teater and Black Box Teater, Oslo
 Krokodillen ["The Crocodile"] (2006)  Teater Ibsen, Skien
 Safari (2006) Teater Blendwerk, Oslo
 Testen ["The Test"] (2006) The Norwegian Drama Festival, Oslo
 Frank (2005)  Det Norske Teatret, Oslo . Winner of Norwegian-Swedish drama competition
 Dama i Luka ["The Lady at the Counter"] (2004)The Norwegian Drama Festival. The Ibsen Award
 Take Me By the Wings (2003) The Norwegian Drama Festival, and Sogn og Fjordane Teater
 More (2002) The Norwegian Drama Festival, Sogn og Fjordane Teater, Cinnober Theatre in Gothenburg and more.

Translations
 English: More, Frank, Neverland, National test
 Swedish: More, Take Me By the Wings
 Danish: Take Me By the Wings
 German: Safari, Neverland, Die Prüfung, Confession
 Portuguese: Frank
 Hungarian: Frank, "National test"
 Italian: More
 Romanian: Frank, Neverland, Safari

Awards 
 Norwegian-Swedish Drama Competition on the centennial of Norway's independence 1905-2005 (Frank)
 The Ibsen Award 2005 (The Lady at the Counter)
 100 og NÅ i 2006 (The Test and Neverland)

External links
 Maria Tryti Vennerød at Nordiska Aps Performing Rights Agency https://web.archive.org/web/20110719130200/http://www.nordiska.dk/?id=21132&author=9682&show=details
 Maria Tryti Vennerød's homepage www.mariatryti.com
 Writers´ Guild of Norway: http://dramatiker.no/index.php?id=15213
 Marias teatermanus best av alle / https://web.archive.org/web/20110629135428/http://www.aftenposten.no/kul_und/article684719.ece
 "Ein siste heilagdom" https://web.archive.org/web/20100209091501/http://www.nb.no/hamsun2009/hamsuns-liv-og-verk/forfattermoeter/forfattermoeter/maria-tryti-venneroed-ein-siste-heilagdom

Living people
1978 births
Norwegian dramatists and playwrights
Norwegian women writers
Norwegian women dramatists and playwrights